Omonia Volleyball Club or Omonia V.C. is the volleyball team of the Omonia Athletic Club based in Nicosia, the capital of Cyprus. It is a founding member of the Cyprus Volleyball Federation and has been participating at its competitions since its inception in 1978.

Omonia V.C.  is ranked 77th (as of August 2022) in the Men's European clubs ranking.

History 

Omonia VC is one of the most successful volleyball clubs in Cyprus. Recently, it celebrated its second consecutive championship and fourth cup. The most notable player has been Panos Eracleous who served the club for 27 years, from 1987 until his retirement in 2014. Nowadays, the club owns its recent success to the so-called golden green generation which refers primarily to Aggelos Alexiou and the Petrakkides twins, Achilleas Petrakkides and the captain Sotos Petrakkides, who after spending some time in other local and foreign teams, returned to Omonia VC where they commenced their careers and conquered domestically. The peak of their reign has been the undefeated defense of their second consecutive domestic championship during the 2015–2016 season.

The manager of the team Savvas Savva, who is in charge since 2013, with a year's break as an assistant coach in 2018, had also commenced his career in Omonia VC  where he served until his retirement. He is by far the most successful manager in the team's history as he has won 7 Cypriot Championships, 3 Cypriot Cups and 6 Supercups.

Omonia VC  has a remarkable record of 29 consecutive wins in all domestic competitions which spans in three different seasons. The strike started on the 20/2/2015 at the 16th round of the 2014–2015 Cypriot championship season and ended on the 11/11/2016 at the 3rd round of the 2016–2017 season. During this period Omonia VC  won 2 Championships, 1 Cup and 2 Super Cups. More recently, Omonia VC has set an undefeated record of 24 wins within a single season, gained them their 5th Championship. Moreover, the club holds another record, that of winning the 2020-2021 title undefeated with 24 wins.

Current squad
Head coach:  Savvas Savva (Volleyball)

Cypriot Championship

The following table presents Omonia's performance at the Cyprus Volleyball Federation championships, for any campaigns adequate information was found.

Domestic finals
The following table presents the seasons where Omonia succeeded to qualify at the Cypriot Cup Final through knock-out phases or the Cypriot Super Cup and the results.

European competitions

Omonia VC's first European success was the elimination of the Montenegrin team OK Sutjeska Nikšić when the current coach Savvas Savva was a teammate of the golden green generation that has won the 6 domestic championships. In a rare occasion, it was drawn to play against their biggest domestic rivals Anorthosis Famagusta where it successfully knocked them out from the competition. 

Home CEV Champions League attendance record

Honours
Cypriot Championships
Winner (7): 2014–15, 2015–16, 2016–17, 2018–19, 2020–21, 2021-2022, 2022-2023
Cyprus Cup:
Winner (8): 1998–99, 2005–06, 2008–09, 2015–16, 2017–18, 2018–19, 2020–21, 2021-22
Cypriot Super Cup:
Winner (7): 2014, 2015, 2016, 2017, 2018, 2019, 2021

References

 
Volleyball clubs established in 1978
1978 establishments in Cyprus
Volleyball clubs in Cyprus
Sport in Nicosia